Nicolás Roberto Angellotti (born 1 April 1990) is an Argentine professional footballer who plays as a goalkeeper for Colegiales.

Career
Angellotti started in Independiente Rivadavia's youth from 2001, which preceded stints with Godoy Cruz and Platense. He was part of Platense's first-team from 2011, though didn't make a league appearance until mid-2012 as he made his bow in a defeat to Villa Dálmine on 5 August; more appearances came later that month versus Chacarita Juniors and Brown. On 30 June 2014, Angellotti joined fellow Primera B Metropolitana side Acassuso. Eight matches followed in two campaigns. He spent 2016 and 2016–17 with Deportivo Morón, in the latter he won promotion to Primera B Nacional after appearing five times in total.

Angellotti signed for Categoría Primera A team Alianza Petrolera on 6 July 2017. However, he terminated his contract on 26 July. After returning from Colombia, Angellotti agreed terms with Defensores de Belgrano of Primera B Metropolitana on 30 July. His first appearances arrived in the succeeding April against Tristán Suárez and Talleres, in a campaign which concluded with promotion. A move to Colegiales was completed on 11 July 2018.

Career statistics
.

Honours
Deportivo Morón
Primera B Metropolitana: 2016–17

References

External links

1990 births
Living people
Footballers from Buenos Aires
Argentine footballers
Association football goalkeepers
Argentine expatriate footballers
Expatriate footballers in Colombia
Argentine expatriate sportspeople in Colombia
Primera B Metropolitana players
Club Atlético Platense footballers
Club Atlético Acassuso footballers
Deportivo Morón footballers
Alianza Petrolera players
Defensores de Belgrano footballers
Club Atlético Colegiales (Argentina) players